A collision avoidance system (CAS), also known as a pre-crash system, forward collision warning system, or collision mitigation system, is an advanced driver-assistance system designed to prevent or reduce the severity of a collision. In its basic form, a forward collision warning system monitors a vehicle's speed, the speed of the vehicle in front of it, and the distance between the vehicles, so that it can provide a warning to the driver if the vehicles get too close, potentially helping to avoid a crash. Various technologies and sensors that are used include radar (all-weather) and sometimes laser (LIDAR) and cameras (employing image recognition) to detect an imminent crash. GPS sensors can detect fixed dangers such as approaching stop signs through a location database. Pedestrian detection can also be a feature of these types of systems.

Collision avoidance systems range from widespread systems mandatory in some countries, such as autonomous emergency braking (AEB) in the EU, agreements between carmakers and safety officials to make crash avoidance systems eventually standard, such as in the United States, to research projects including some manufacturer specific devices.

Advanced emergency braking system (AEBS)
The World Forum for Harmonization of Vehicle Regulations define AEBS (also automated emergency braking in some jurisdictions). UN ECE regulation 131 requires a system which can automatically detect a potential forward collision and activate the vehicle braking system to decelerate a vehicle with the purpose of avoiding or mitigating a collision. UN ECE regulation 152 says deceleration can be 5 metres per second squared.

Once an impending collision is detected, these systems provide a warning to the driver. When the collision becomes imminent, they can take action autonomously without any driver input (by braking or steering or both). Collision avoidance by braking is appropriate at low vehicle speeds (e.g. below ), while collision avoidance by steering may be more appropriate at higher vehicle speeds if lanes are clear. Cars with collision avoidance may also be equipped with adaptive cruise control, using the same forward-looking sensors.

AEB differs from forward collision warning: FCW alerts the driver with a warning but does not by itself brake the vehicle.

According to Euro NCAP, AEB has three characteristics:
 Autonomous: the system acts independently of the driver to avoid or mitigate the accident.
 Emergency: the system will intervene only in a critical situation.
 Braking: the system tries to avoid the accident by applying the brakes.

Time-to-collision could be a way to choose which avoidance method (braking or steering) is most appropriate.

A collision avoidance system by steering is a new concept. It is considered by some research projects.
Collision avoidance system by steering has some limitations: over-dependence on lane markings, sensor limitations, and interaction between driver and system.

History

Early approaches and forward collision avoidance system
Early warning systems were attempted as early as the late 1950s. An example is Cadillac, which developed a prototype vehicle named the Cadillac Cyclone which used the new radar technology to detect objects in front of the car with the radar sensors mounted inside "nose cones". It was deemed too costly to manufacture.

The first modern forward collision avoidance system was patented in 1990 by William L Kelley.

The second modern forward collision avoidance system was demonstrated in 1995 by a team of scientists and engineers at Hughes Research Laboratories (HRL) in Malibu, California. The project was funded by Delco Electronics and was led by HRL physicist Ross D. Olney. The technology was marketed as Forewarn. The system was radar-based  a technology that was readily available at Hughes Electronics, but not commercially elsewhere. A small custom fabricated radar antenna was developed specifically for this automotive application at 77  GHz.

The first production laser adaptive cruise control on a Toyota vehicle was introduced on the Celsior model (Japan only) in August 1997.

Commercial and regulatory development
In 2008, AEB was introduced in the British market.

Between 2010 and 2014, Euro NCAP rewarded various constructors whose system had AEB features.

In the early-2000s, the U.S. National Highway Traffic Safety Administration (NHTSA) studied whether to make frontal collision warning systems and lane departure warning systems mandatory. In 2011, the European Commission investigated the stimulation of "collision mitigation by braking" systems. Mandatory fitting (extra cost option) of Advanced Emergency Braking Systems in commercial vehicles was scheduled to be implemented on 1 November 2013 for new vehicle types and on 1 November 2015 for all new vehicles in the European Union. According to the "impact assessment", this could prevent around 5,000 fatalities and 50,000 serious injuries per year across the EU.

In March 2016, the National Highway Traffic Safety Administration (NHTSA) and the Insurance Institute for Highway Safety announced the manufacturers of 99% of U.S. automobiles had agreed to include automatic emergency braking systems as standard on virtually all new cars sold in the U.S. by 2022. In Europe, there was a related agreement about an AEBS or AEB in 2012. United Nations Economic Commission for Europe (UNECE) has announced that this kind of system will become mandatory for new heavy vehicles starting in 2015. AEBS is regulated by UNECE regulation 131. NHTSA projected that the ensuing accelerated rollout of automatic emergency braking would prevent an estimated 28,000 collisions and 12,000 injuries.

In 2016, 40% of US car model have AEB as an option.

, in the United Kingdom, an estimated 1,586,103 vehicles had AEB. This makes AEB available in 4.3% of the British vehicle fleet.

Australia

In April 2020 AEB is:
 standard on 66% of new light vehicle models (passenger cars, SUVs and light commercial vehicles) sold in Australia,
 10% on higher grade variants only (AEB not available on base variant)
 6% as option 
 16% have no form of AEB

United States

Since 2015, the NHTSA has recommended AEB for vehicles. , it is not mandatory in the US vehicles. However, in 2016, the NHTSA  convinced automobile manufacturers to include AEB in 99% of new cars car sold in the US by 1 September 2022.

On 9 June 2021, in Phoenix, USA, a heavy truck going too fast for traffic conditions crashed with seven other vehicles on a motorway, 
killing four people and hurting nine. Two days later, US National Transportation Safety Board, prepare a nine-person team to investigate this crash, and to assess whether automatic emergency braking in the truck would have helped to mitigate or prevent the crash.

In 2019, 66% of autobrake systems evaluate by the IIHS in 2019 models earn the highest rating of superior for front crash prevention.

Japan

In 2017, AEB is one of the most popular forms of ADAS in Japan,
in Japan more than 40% of newly manufactured vehicles equipped with some type of ADAS had AEB.

In 2018, 84.6% of cars had a kind of AEB in Japan, but the certification goal was not met by each of them.

As a mandatory feature
From the fiscal year 2021, in Japan, all new cars should have automatic braking systems to prevent accidents, including with a car or pedestrian but not with cyclists, at speeds defined by three international regulations.

In the European Union, advanced emergency-braking system is required by law on new vehicle models from May 2022, and all new vehicles sold by May 2024.

In India, autonomous emergency braking system (AEB) could become mandatory on new cars by 2022.

In the United States, automakers voluntary committed to releasing automatic emergency braking as a standard feature on all new cars and trucks starting in 2022, to provide AEB three years earlier than through a regulatory process.

In Australia where AEB is not yet mandatory, the federal government has suggested in a Regulation Impact Statement (RIS) that car-to-car and pedestrian AEB should be standard on all new models launched from July 2022 and all new vehicles sold from July 2024 like in the European Union.
AEB systems are required on all newly introduced vehicle models from March 2023, and all models on sale in Australia from March 2025.

Legal changes applicable from 2025

For HGVs and buses, new UNECE standards have been defined to improve AEB.
From 2025, in the EU, those new standards will apply to new types of vehicle.

Those changes were raised after crash inquiries which found some lorry drivers regularly switch off their AEB systems to drive closer to the vehicle in front. The regulation change will limit system deactivation to 15 minutes with automatic re-engagement after 15 minutes.

Benefits and limitations

Benefits

A 2012 study by the Insurance Institute for Highway Safety examined how particular features of crash-avoidance systems affected the number of claims under various forms of insurance coverage. The findings indicate that two crash-avoidance features provide the biggest benefits: (a) autonomous braking that would brake on its own, if the driver does not, to avoid a forward collision, and (b) adaptive headlights that would shift the headlights in the direction the driver steers. They found lane departure systems to be not helpful, and perhaps harmful, at the circa 2012 stage of development. A 2015 Insurance Institute for Highway Safety study found forward collision warning and automatic braking systems reduced rear collisions.

A 2015 study based on European and Australasian data suggests the AEB can decrease rear-end collisions by 38%.

In the 2016 Berlin truck attack, the vehicle used was brought to a stop by its automatic braking system. Collision avoidance features are rapidly making their way into the new vehicle fleet. In a study of police-reported crashes, automatic emergency braking was found to reduce the incidence of rear-end crashes by 39 percent. A 2012 study suggests that if all cars feature the system, it will reduce accidents by up to 27 percent and save up to 8,000 lives per year on European roads.

A 2016 US study on trucks, considering 6,000 CAS activations from over 3 million miles and 110,000 hours driving performed with year 2013 technology, find that CAS activations were the result of lead vehicle actions, such as braking, turning, switching lanes, or merging.

In the UK and the US, third-party damages and costs have decreased by 10% and 40% according to some insurances.

Efficiency varies depending on analysis, according to the European Commission:
 38% drop in accidents according to Fildes, 2015
 9%-20% drop in collision according to Volvo
 44% drop according to Ciccino

In April 2019, IIHS/HLDI considered real-world benefits of crash avoidance technologies, based on rates of police-reported crashes and insurance claims. Forward collision warning plus autobrake is associated with a 50% decrease in front to rear crashes and a 56% decrease in front to rear crashes with injuries, while forward collision warning alone is associated with only a 27% decrease in front to rear crashes and an only 20% decrease in front to rear crashes with injuries. The rear automatic braking is considered to have generated a 78% decrease in backing crashes (when combined with the rearview camera and parking sensor). However, repair costs with this equipment are an average of  higher due to the sensors being in areas prone to damage.

In Australia, AEB has been found to reduce police-reported crashes by 55 percent, rear-end crashes by 40 percent, and vehicle occupant trauma by 28 percent.

A 2020 Italian study suggests AEB reduces rear-end collision by 45% based on data from event data recorders in a sample of 1.5 million vehicles in 2017 and 1.8 million in 2018, for recent vehicles.

It has been estimated that ALKS could help to avoid 47,000 serious accidents and save 3,900 lives over the first decade in the United Kingdom.

Limitations and safety issues

A NTSB communication suggests that some vehicle collision avoidance assist systems are not able to detect damaged crash attenuators. Therefore the vehicle may drive into the crash attenuator. The NTSB considers such a feature would be a must-have for safety with partially automated vehicles to detect potential hazards and warn of potential hazards to drivers.

Inclement weather such as heavy rain, snow, or fog may temporarily inhibit the effectiveness of the systems.

In Japan, there were 72 car-reported accidents in 2018, 101 in 2018, and 80 between January and September 2019 caused by drivers placing too much confidence in automatic brakes, with 18 of them resulting in injuries or death.

Unnecessary AEB

Unnecessary AEB might trigger in situations such as shadows on the road, cars parked or metal road signs on the side of the middle of a curve, steep driveways.

Features
AEB systems aim to detect possible collisions with the car in front. This is performed using sensors to detect and classify things in front of the vehicle, a system to interpret the data from the sensors, and a braking system which can work autonomously.

Some cars may implement lane departure warning systems.

Pedestrian detection
Since 2004, Honda has developed a night vision system that highlights pedestrians in front of the vehicle by alerting the driver with an audible chime and visually displaying them via HUD. Honda's system only works in temperatures below 30 degrees Celsius (86 Fahrenheit). This system first appeared on the Honda Legend.

To assist in pedestrian safety as well as driver safety, Volvo implemented a pedestrian airbag in the Volvo V40, introduced in 2012.
Many more manufacturers are developing Pedestrian crash avoidance mitigation (PCAM) systems.

In the United States, the IIHS considers:
.

ANCAP reports
Since 2018, the ANCAP provides AEB rating and tests AEB features.

The ANCAP report in its adult occupant protection section contains AEB rating taking into account AEB City from 10 to 50  km/h.

The ANCAP report in its vulnerable user protection section contains AEB rating taking into account both AEB and FCW for pedestrian and cyclists,  with various speeds named "Operational from" (for instance 10 to 80  km/h) in the reports:
 For pedestrians in day and night: adult crossing, a child running, and an adult walking along.
 For cyclists in the day only: cyclist crossing, a cyclist traveling along.

The ANCAP report in its safety assist section contains AEB rating taking into account the AEB interurban with various speeds named "Operational from" (for instance 10 to 180  km/h):
 HMI performance
 FCW (stationary and slower-moving car)
 AEB interurban (car braking lightly, car braking heavily, driving toward slower-moving car)

Reverse automatic braking
In the US by 2017, 5% of cars were capable of reverse automatic braking. This feature allows autonomous braking of the vehicle while working in the reverse direction, to avoid a reverse collision. Those systems are assessed by IIHS.

Emergency steering function 
The emergency steering function, known as ESF, is an automated steering function that detects a potential collision and automatically activates the steering system for a limited duration to avoid or mitigate a collision.

The emergency steering function for UNECE countries is described by regulation 79.

Automated lane keeping Systems

Automated Lane Keeping Systems (ALKS) deals with avoiding some cases of collisions.

ALKS defines some concepts:

Regulations
AEB and ALKS are each defined by one or several UN-ECE regulations.

Regulation related to AEB are regulation 131 et 152.

Regulation 157 is related to ALKS.

Japan requires AEB since 2020 and ALKS since 2021. The European Union requires AEB since 2022 but did not define a date for ALKS.

Automobile manufacturers
Various vendors provide AEB components to automakers. The global automotive AEB system market consists of a few established companies that are manufacturers or suppliers of specialized AEB components or systems. For example, the main vendors for radar systems include Bosch, Delphi, Denso, TRW, and Continental. Automobile manufactures may describe the systems installed on their vehicles using different names to differentiate their marketing efforts. A particular automaker may have systems and sensors sourced from a variety of suppliers. Therefore, even a single car brand may offer various levels of technology sophistication and the: frequency of false alerts can be different from model to model and trim level to trim level, depending on the types of camera and/or laser-based systems installed.

In countries, such as the UK, one-quarter of new vehicles might have some kind of AEB system; but only 1% of previously sold cars might have AEB.

Audi
"Pre sense" autonomous emergency braking system uses twin radar and monocular camera sensors and was introduced in 2010 on the 2011 Audi A8.
"Pre sense plus" works in four phases. The system first provides warning of an impending accident, activating hazard warning lights, closing windows and sunroof, and pre-tensioning front seat belts. The warning is followed by light braking to get the driver's attention. The fourth phase increases braking to  followed by automatic full braking power, roughly half a second before projected impact. "Pre sense rear", is designed to reduce the consequences of rear-end collisions. The sunroof and windows are closed and seat belts are prepared for impact. The seats are moved forward to protect the car's occupants. 2015 introduced the "avoidance assistant" system that intervenes in the steering to help the driver avoid an obstacle. If an accident occurs, the "turning assistant" monitors opposing traffic when turning left at low speeds. In critical situations, it brakes the car. "Multi collision brake assist" uses controlled braking maneuvers during the accident to aid the driver. Both systems were introduced on the Second generation Q7.

BMW
In 2012 BMW introduced two systems on the 7 Series. "Active Protection" detects imminent accidents to pretension safety belts, closes windows and moonroof, brings the backrest of the front passenger seat to an upright position, and activates post-crash braking. A driver drowsiness detection includes advice to take a break from driving. An "Active Driving Assistant" combines lane departure warning, pedestrian protection, and city collision mitigation.

In 2013, "Driving Assistant Plus" was introduced on most models combining the front-facing camera, lane-departure warning, and in some cases front radar sensors to detect vehicles ahead. Should the driver not react to the warning of a potential collision, the system would gradually prime brake pressure and apply with maximum deceleration power if necessary. In the case of a crash, the system can bring the vehicle to a standstill. Later iterations of the system on cars equipped with an Automatic Cruise Control system are improved by combining radar and camera detection during fog, rain, and other situations where normal camera operations may be compromised.

Ford

Beginning on the 2012 Ford Focus, Active City Stop was offered on the range-topping Titanium model, under the optional Sports Executive Pack. The system used windscreen-mounted cameras, radars, and lidars to monitor the road ahead.

General Motors
General Motors' collision alert system was introduced in GMC Terrain SUVs in 2012. It uses a camera to provide a warning when there is a vehicle ahead or there is a lane departure.
The 2014 Chevrolet Impala received the radar- and camera-based crash imminent braking (radar technology detects a possible crash threat and alerts the driver. If the driver does not appear to react quickly enough or doesn’t react at all, this feature intervenes to apply the brakes to avoid the crash. Forward collision alert, lane departure warning, side blind zone alert (using radar sensors on both sides of the vehicle, the system “looks” for other vehicles in the blind zone areas of the Impala and indicates their presence with LED-lit symbols in the outside mirrors. Rear cross-traffic alert features.

Honda
2003: Honda introduced an autonomous braking (Collision Mitigation Brake System CMBS, originally CMS) front collision avoidance system on the Inspire and later in Acura, using a radar-based system to monitor the situation ahead and provide brake assistance if the driver reacts with insufficient force on the brake pedal after a warning in the instrument cluster and a tightening of the seat belts. The Honda system was the first production system to provide automatic braking. The 2003 Honda system also incorporated an "E-Pretensioner", which worked in conjunction with the CMBS system with electric motors on the seat belts. When activated, the CMBS has three warning stages. The first warning stage includes audible and visual warnings to brake. If ignored, the second stage would include the E-Pretensioner's tugging on the shoulder portion of the seat belt two to three times as an additional tactile warning to the driver to take action. The third stage, in which the CMBS predicts that a collision is unavoidable, includes full seat belt slack takeup by the E-Pretensioner for more effective seat belt protection and automatic application of the brakes to lessen the severity of the predicted crash. The E-Pretensioner would also work to reduce seat belt slack whenever the brakes are applied and the brake assist system is activated.

Jaguar Land Rover
As part of the InControl suite of services, Jaguar Land Rover provides several driver assistance technologies, amongst which are autonomous emergency braking, intelligent emergency braking, lane departure warning, blind spot monitor and blind spot assist.  The systems variously use both microwave and optical detection methods.

Mercedes-Benz
2002: Mercedes' "Pre-Safe" system was exhibited at the Paris Motor Show on the 2003 S-Class. Using electronic stability control sensors to measure steering angle, vehicle yaw, and lateral acceleration and brake assist (BAS) sensors to detect emergency braking, the system can tighten the seat belts, adjust seat positions, including rear seats (if installed), raise folded rear headrests (if installed), and close the sunroof if it detects a possible collision (including rollover). A later version of the Pre-Safe system was supplemented by an additional function that can close any open windows if necessary.

2006: Mercedes-Benz's "Brake Assist BAS Plus" was their first forward warning collision system introduced on the W221 S-Class, it incorporates the autonomous cruise control system and adds a radar-based collision warning.

2006: the "Pre-Safe Brake" on the CL-Class C216 was their first to offer partial autonomous braking (40%, or up to 0.4g deceleration) if the driver does not react to the BAS Plus warnings and the system detects a severe danger of an accident.

2009: Mercedes introduced the first Pre-Safe Brake with full (100%) autonomous braking with maximum braking force approximately 0.6 seconds before impact, on the Mercedes-Benz E-Class (W212).

2013: Mercedes updated Pre-Safe on the W222 S-Class as plus with cross-traffic assist. Pre-Safe with pedestrian detection and City Brake function is a combination of stereo camera and radar sensors to detect pedestrians in front of the vehicle. Visual and acoustic warnings are triggered when a hazard is spotted. If the driver then reacts by braking, the braking power will be boosted as the situation requires, up to a full brake application. Should the driver fail to react, Pre-Safe Brake triggers autonomous vehicle braking. A radar sensor in the rear bumper monitors the traffic behind the vehicle. If the risk of an impact from the rear is detected, the rear hazard warning lights are activated to alert the driver of the vehicle behind (not on vehicles with USA/Canada coding). Anticipatory occupant protection measures, such as the reversible belt tensioners, are deployed. If the vehicle is stopped and the driver indicates a wish to remain stationary by depressing the brake pedal, activating the hold function, or moving the selector lever to "P" the system increases the brake pressure to keep the vehicle firmly braked during a possible rear-end collision. Pre-Safe Impulse works an early phase of the crash, before the resulting deceleration starts to increase, the front occupants are pulled away from the direction of impact and deeper into their seats by their seat belts. By the time the accident enters the phase when loads peak, the extra distance they are retracted by can be used while dissipating energy in a controlled fashion. Pre-acceleration and force limitation allow the occupants to be temporarily isolated from the effects of the crash, significantly reducing the risk and severity of injuries in a frontal collision.

Nissan
Nissan's Infiniti brand offers both laser-based and radar-based systems.  Brake assist with preview function anticipates the need to apply emergency braking and pre-pressurize the brake system to help improve brake response. Intelligent brake assist (IBA) with forwarding emergency braking (FEB) (on QX80) uses radar to monitor approaching speed to the vehicle ahead, helping detect an imminent collision. It provides a two-stage warning to alert the driver, and if the driver takes no action, the system automatically engages the brakes to mitigate the collision speed and impact. A predictive forward collision warning system warns the driver of risks that may be obscured from the driver's view. It senses the relative velocity and distance of a vehicle directly ahead, as well as a vehicle traveling in front of the preceding one. The forward emergency braking system judges that deceleration is required, it alerts the driver using both a screen display and sound, then generates a force that pushes the accelerator pedal up and applies partial braking to assist the driver in slowing the vehicle down. When the system judges that there is the possibility of a collision, it will automatically apply harder braking to help avoid one.

Nissan has been under investigation for collision avoidance systems on late-model Rogue models that allegedly brake the vehicles for no reason, according to the US National Highway Traffic Safety Administration (NHTSA). , Nissan considered the issue strictly as a "performance update" by issuing technical service bulletins—at least three since January 2019—that pertain to reprogramming the radar control unit, according to the agency. At least 553,860 cars are potentially affected from the 2017 and 2018 model years.

Subaru
Subaru's system, branded "EyeSight", was announced in May 2008 using stereo camera technology to detect pedestrians and bicyclists. As initially announced, EyeSight enabled pre-collision braking control and adaptive cruise control at all speeds. It was rolled out in Japan to selected models in 2010; in Australia in 2011; and in North America in 2012 for the 2013 model year Legacy and Outback models.
An alarm is used to warn the driver of a potential collision hazard in the pre-collision system.

Above , the vehicle will reduce its speed automatically. It also allows the vehicle to engage braking assist, if there is a risk of a frontal collision and the driver suddenly applies the brakes. The adaptive cruise control was also upgraded in 2010 to allow automatic emergency braking in traffic, fully stopping the EyeSight vehicle when the car in front has come to a complete stop.

In 2013, color was added to the cameras, allowing the system to recognize brake lights and red stoplights ahead.
Subaru also added an active lane-keeping (keeping the vehicle in the middle of the lane, and applying steering force to keep the vehicle in the lane when unintentionally crossing lane markers) and throttle management (to prevent sudden unintended acceleration in forward and reverse) systems in 2013 with the improved cameras.
EyeSight has been very popular, equipped on approximately 90% of all Legacy and Outbacks sold in Japan at the beginning of 2012, and the engineers responsible for its development won a prize from the Japanese government that year.

, EyeSight is standard on the Ascent, Forester, Legacy, and Outback. It is also standard on all CVT equipped Crosstrek, Impreza, and WRX. It became standard on the automatic-equipped BRZ as of 2022.

Toyota

Toyota's system, branded "Toyota Safety Sense" or "Lexus Safety Sense",  is a radar-based system that uses a forward-facing millimeter-wave radar. When the system determines that a frontal collision is unavoidable, it preemptively tightens the seat belts, removing any slack, and pre-charges the brakes using brake assist to give the driver maximum stopping power when the driver depresses the brake pedal.

2003 February: Toyota launched PCS in the redesigned Japanese domestic market Harrier.

2003 August: added an automatic partial pre-crash braking system to the Celsior.

2003 September: PCS made available in North America on the Lexus LS 430, becoming the first radar-guided forward-collision warning system offered in the US.

2004: In July 2004, the Crown Majesta radar PCS added a single digital camera to improve the accuracy of collision forecast and warning and control levels.

2006: Pre-collision system with Driver Monitoring System introduced in March 2006 on the Lexus GS 450h using a CCD camera on the steering column. This system monitors the driver's face to determine where the driver is looking. If the driver's head turns away from the road and a frontal obstacle is detected, the system will alert the driver using a buzzer, and if necessary, pre-charge the brakes and tighten the safety belts.

2006: the Lexus LS introduced an advanced pre-collision system (APCS), added a twin-lens stereo camera located on the windshield, and a more sensitive radar to detect smaller "soft" objects such as animals and pedestrians. A near-infrared projector located in the headlights allows the system to work at night. With the adaptive variable suspension (AVS) and electric power steering, the system can change the shock absorber firmness, steering gear ratios, and torque assists to aid the driver's evasive steering measures. The lane departure warning system will make automatic steering adjustments to help ensure that the vehicle maintains its lane in case the driver fails to react. Driver Monitoring System was introduced on the Lexus LS. Rear-end pre-collision system includes a rearward-facing millimeter-wave radar mounted in the rear bumper. The system adjusts the active head restraints by moving them upward and forward to reduce the risk of whiplash injuries if an imminent rear collision is detected.

2008: Improved driver monitoring system added on the Crown for detecting whether the driver's eyes are properly open. It monitors the driver's eyes to detect the driver's level of wakefulness. This system is designed to work even if the driver is wearing sunglasses at night.

2008: PCS with GPS-navigation linked brake assist function on the Crown. The system is designed to determine if the driver is late in decelerating at an approaching stop sign, will then sound an alert, and can also pre-charge the brakes to provide braking force if deemed necessary. This system works in certain Japanese cities and requires Japan-specific road markings that are detected by a camera.

2009: Crown added a front-side millimeter-wave radar to detect potential side collisions primarily at intersections or when another vehicle crosses the center line. The latest version tilts the rear seat upward, placing the passenger in a more ideal crash position if it detects a front or rear impact.

The higher-speed APCS uses the same technologies as the current APCs. This system increases the braking force up to twice that applied by average drivers. It was not then available in U.S. markets.

2013: Pre-collision system with pedestrian-avoidance steer assist and steering bypass assist can help prevent collisions in cases where automatic braking alone is not sufficient, such as when the vehicle is traveling too fast or a pedestrian suddenly steps into the vehicle’s path. An on-board sensor detects pedestrians and issues a visual alert on the dashboard immediately in front of the driver if the system determines that there is a risk of collision. If the likelihood of a collision increases, the system issues an audio and visual alarm to encourage the driver to take evasive action, and the increased pre-collision braking force and automatic braking functions are activated. If the system determines that a collision cannot be avoided by braking alone and there is sufficient room for avoidance, steer assist is activated to steer the vehicle away from the pedestrian.

2016: Toyota announced it would make Toyota Safety Sense (TSS) and Lexus Safety System+ standard on nearly all Japan, Europe, and US models by the end of 2017.

2017: Lexus introduced the updated Lexus Safety System+ 2.0 on the fifth-generation LS. In the US 2017 model year, Toyota sold more vehicles equipped with collision warnings than any other single brand with a total of 1.4 million sold or 56% of their fleet.

2018: Toyota released its updated Toyota Safety Sense 2.0 (TSS 2.0) to include Lane Tracing Assist, Road Sign Assist, and Low Light Pedestrian Detection with Daytime Bicyclist Detection which improves the Pre-Collision System. The first Japanese car model to receive (TSS 2.0) is the executive Crown in its 15th generation.

2021: Lexus introduced the updated Lexus Safety System+ 3.0 in the Lexus NX. The suite contains a Risk Avoidance Emergency Steer Assist, a Right/Left Turn Oncoming Vehicle Detection/Braking, an Oncoming Vehicle Detection, a Dynamic Radar Cruise Control with Curve Speed Management, a Road Sign Assist, a Pre-Collision System, a Lane Assistance and an Intelligent High Beam.

Volkswagen

2010: "Front Assist" on 2011 Volkswagen Touareg can brake the car to a stop in case of an emergency and tension the seat belts as a precautionary measure.

2012: Volkswagen Golf Mk7 introduced a "Proactive Occupant Protection" that will close the windows and retract the safety belts to remove excess slack if the potential for a forward crash is detected. Multi-collision brake system (automatic post-collision braking system) to automatically brake the car after an accident to avoid a second collision. City emergency braking automatically activates brakes at low speeds in urban situations.

2014: Volkswagen Passat (B8) introduces pedestrian recognition as a part of the system. It uses a sensor fusion between a camera and the radar sensor. There is an "emergency assist" in case of a non-reacting driver, the car takes the control of the brakes and the steering until a complete stop. This is also found on the Volkswagen Golf Mk8.

Volvo

2006: Volvo's "Collision Warning with Auto Brake" was introduced in 2007 S80. This system is powered by a radar/camera sensor fusion and provides a warning through a head up display that visually resembles brake lamps. If the driver does not react, the system pre-charges the brakes and increases the brake assist sensitivity to maximize driver braking performance. Later versions would automatically apply the brakes to minimize pedestrian impacts. In some models of Volvos, the automatic braking system can be manually turned off. The V40 also included the first pedestrian airbag, when it was introduced in 2012.

2013: Volvo introduced the first cyclist detection system. All Volvo automobiles now come standard with a lidar laser sensor that monitors the front of the roadway, and if a potential collision is detected, the safety belts will retract to reduce excess slack. Volvo now includes this safety device as an option in FH series trucks.

2015: "IntelliSafe" with auto brake at the intersection. The Volvo XC90 features automatic braking if the driver turns in front of an oncoming car. This is a common scenario at busy city crossings as well as on highways, where the speed limits are higher.

March 2020: Volvo recalled 121,000 cars over auto emergency braking failure. The system may not detect an object and so may not work as intended, increasing the risk of a crash.

List of cars with available collision avoidance features

 Acura: ILX, MDX, RDX, RL RLX, TLX
 Audi: A3 from 2013, A6 from 2011, A7 from 2010, A8, Q7 from 2015
 BMW Group: 2 Series, 3 Series, 4 Series, 5 Series, 7 Series, Mini Cooper
 Buick: Enclave
 Cadillac: 2013 ATS, 2013 XTS
 Chevrolet: Tenth generation Impala, Traverse, Equinox, Silverado, Volt
 Dodge: All models
 Ford: Edge, Escape, Everest, F-Series, Fiesta, Flex, Focus, Fusion, Kuga, Mustang, Ranger, Taurus, Transit Connect
 GMC: Acadia, Terrain
 Honda: Accord, Civic, Clarity, CR-V, Fit, HR-V, Insight, Odyssey, Passport, Pilot, Ridgeline
 Hyundai: Elantra from 2016
 Infiniti: FX, EX, Q50, QX56, QX60
 Jeep: All Models
 Lexus: LS from 2003, GS (2005), IS (2005), RX (2008), NX (2014)
 Lincoln: Aviator, Continental, Corsair, MKS, MKZ, Nautilus, Navigator
 Mazda: Mazda2, Mazda3, Mazda6, CX-3, CX-5, CX-9
 Mercedes-Benz: Mercedes-Benz B Class, CLA Class, E-Class, S-Class, M Class
 Mitsubishi: Outlander, Pajero Sport
 Nissan: Nissan X-Trail Tekna, 2015 Nissan Rogue (2019) Nissan LEAF (2019), Nissan Altima (2019), Nissan Pathfinder (2020)
 Perodua Myvi (1.5 Advance), 2017
 Peugeot: 308, 2014
 SsangYong: Rexton, Tivoli
 Subaru: Ascent, BRZ (2022+), Crosstrek, Forester, Impreza, Legacy, Outback, WRX
 Suzuki: Kizashi, PRECRS, JDM only
 Tesla: Model S (starting with 2015 model year), Model X, Model 3, Model Y
 Toyota: All Models except Toyota 4Runner 2020 and up to get it and Yaris 2019 and up to get it
 Volkswagen Group: Audi A4, Audi A5, Audi A6, Audi A7, Audi A8, Porsche Cayenne (3rd Generation), Porsche Macan, VW Up!, SEAT Mii, Skoda Citigo, Volkswagen Golf R
 Volvo: all models

New car assessment program
Euro NCAP and C-NCAP and ANCAP are involved in taking into account the Autonomous Emergency Braking (AEB) in their respective New Car Assessment Program.

Since 2016, Euro NCAP takes into account pedestrian in AEB rating.

In 2018, Euro NCAP provides assessments for AEB city (since 2014), AEB interurban (since 2014), AEB pedestrian (since 2018), and AEB cyclist (since 2018). Since 2018, ANCAP has also provided assessments for AEB city, AEB interurban, AEB pedestrian, and cyclist.

Cost
Many vehicles have AEB fitted as standard. The AEB is not available for every car. When AEB is available as an option, its cost can be in the £180 (AEB city only) £1300 (regular AEB) range.

The cost of optional AEB will depend, in part, on whether certain other safety systems are installed. The electronic and sensor systems that underpin adaptive cruise control and forward-collision warning systems, for example, are well-suited, if not prerequisites, to an AEB system.

See also

 Adaptive cruise control
 Advanced Automatic Collision Notification
 Autonomous car
 Automotive night vision
 Brake Assist
 Electronic stability control
 Lane departure warning system
 LIDAR#Object detection for transportation systems
 Blind spot monitor
 Intelligent Car
 GPS tracking

References

External links

 
 Ratings of existing crash avoidance systems, Insurance Institute for Highway Safety, January 2017.
 Intelligent Transportation Systems: Collision Avoidance , 2004.
 ERSEC Project (FP7 247955): Enhanced Road Safety by integrating Egnos-Galileo data with on-board Control system for car collision avoidance applications, 2011.
 Acumine Collision Avoidance Safety System (ACASS), 2007.
 DSRC/Wave Vehicle Communication and Traffic Simulator eTEXAS
 Euro NCAP’s fitment survey
 Ford: Safer Driving Through Vehicle collision avoidance systems
 
 Collision Avoidance System of TORSA

Vehicle safety technologies